Giovanni Cola di Franco was an Italian Mannerist architect active between 1596 and 1621, mainly in Naples, where he was born and died. He collaborated with contemporary architects such as Francesco Grimaldi, Bartolomeo Picchiatti and Giovan Giacomo Di Conforto.

Bibliography (in Italian) 
 Francesco Abbate, Storia dell'arte nell'Italia meridionale: il Cinquecento, vol. 3, Roma, Donzelli Editore, 2001, .
 Emilio Ricciardi, Il "Poggio delle Mortelle" nella storia dell'architettura napoletana", degree thesis in Storia dell'architettura e della città, 2006. 
 Francesco Domenico Moccia and Dante Caporali (ed.), NapoliGuida. Tra luoghi e monumenti della città storica, Clean, 2001, .

16th-century Italian architects
17th-century Italian architects
16th-century Neapolitan people
17th-century Neapolitan people